Matthew Hawrilenko (born January 3, 1982) is an American former professional poker player from Boston, Massachusetts who won the 2009 World Series of Poker $5,000 No-Limit Hold'em Short-Handed event earning $1,003,218 and is a Full Tilt Poker Pro.

Hawrilenko is a 2004 graduate of Princeton University who worked for Susquehanna International Group prior to becoming a professional poker player. He later went to Clark University for PHD in clinical psychology.

As of 2011, his total live tournament winnings exceed $1,600,000.

World Series of Poker bracelets

References 

1982 births
Living people
World Series of Poker bracelet winners
American poker players